TVN CNBC was a Polish pay television business and financial news channel, launched on 3 September 2007. It was part of TVN Group (Polish: Grupa TVN SA) which in turn is controlled by Warner Bros. Discovery. The channel's main newsroom and studio were located at the Media Business Centre building in Warsaw. TVN CNBC's Programming Director was Roman Młodkowski. He's a veteran presenter and journalist originally from TVN. TVN CNBC was also managed by Adam Pieczyński, TVN's Chief News Director.

The channel was launched in cooperation with CNBC Europe, and was part of NBC Universal's worldwide network of business-oriented channels. It also served as CNBC's "Polish Bureau" providing occasional live feeds for breaking news in Poland and Central Europe. The facilities were also used to produce Poland's first TV series about Polish business – "Business Poland" which aired as part of CNBC's weekend programming in Europe and weekly programming on CNBC World in North America.

TVN CNBC also provided business news segments for TVN24, Poland's first news channel. On 1 January 2014 TVN CNBC was rebranded as TVN24 Biznes i Świat, a new financial news channel created after TVN Group had not renewed CNBC license.

Polsat Biznes, a competitor to TVN CNBC a channel belonging to the Polsat Group, closed in 2014.

About lineup changes 
Due to global cutbacks, TVN also made big cutbacks reducing their productions. As a result, TVN CNBC cut its original offerings to the lineup listed below.

Final programming lineup 
 Pieniądze od rana (Money in the Morning)
 90 minut (90 Minutes)
 Dzień na rynkach (Day on the Market)
 TVN CNBC CR (TVN CNBC local)
 Rynki Dnia (Market Day)
 Bilans (Balance)
 Blajer mówi: Biznes   (Blajer Says Business)
 Godzina dla pieniędzy (Money Hour)
 Koniec Handlu (End of Trading)
 World Business
 Koła fortuny (Fortune Wheel)
 Górna Półka (Upper Shelf)

Original programming lineup 
Pieniądze od rana
90 minut
Biznes Lunch
Dzień na rynkach 
Bilans
Piąta godzina (The 5th Hour)
Portfel (Wallet)
Firma (Firm)
Progr@m
Inwestuj (Invest!)
Logistyk (Logistics)
Praca (Work)
Marketing & PR 
Cywilne na co dzień  (Everyday Law)
Golf
Nieruchomości (Real Estate)
Ostatnie piętro (Last Floor)
Business Poland (Weekly, 15-minute wrap on Polish Business. It is the first TV Series about Poland in English. It was produced by Tyrel McMahan for CNBC)

Sister channels in CNBC Europe branches 
CNBC Europe
CNBC Arabiya
CNBC-e

See also 
List of CNBC channels

External links 

TVN's website
"Business Poland" site on CNBC.com

References

CNBC global channels
Defunct television channels in Poland
Television channels and stations established in 2007
Television channels and stations disestablished in 2013
TVN (Polish TV channel)